Emmanuel Carlos Osei (born 25 December 1992) is a Ghanaian professional footballer who plays as a forward for Kaya–Iloilo of the Philippines Football League (PFL).

Career

Club
Osei signed a three-year contract with Asante Kotoko in June 2016. In February 2017, Osei moved to Bechem United on a season-long loan deal. Osei was released by Asante Kotoko in November 2017.
On 11 January 2018, Osei signed for Dordoi Bishkek on a one-year contract, leaving by mutual agreement on 16 July 2018, having scored 4 league goals. In September 2018, Osei went on trial with Rwanda Premier League club Rayon Sports.

Osei was signed by Kaya–Iloilo for the 2020 Philippines Football League season.

References

External links

1992 births
Living people
Footballers from Accra
Ghanaian footballers
Ashanti Gold SC players
Asante Kotoko S.C. players
Bechem United FC players
Association football forwards
Ghanaian expatriate footballers
Ghanaian expatriates in Kyrgyzstan
Expatriate footballers in Kyrgyzstan